Hillingdon London Borough Council is the local authority for the London Borough of Hillingdon in Greater London, England. It is a London borough council, one of 32 in the United Kingdom capital of London. Hillingdon is divided into 22 wards, electing a total of 65 councillors. The council was created by the London Government Act 1963 and replaced four local authorities: Uxbridge Borough Council, Hayes and Harlington Urban District Council, Ruislip-Northwood Urban District Council and Yiewsley and West Drayton Urban District Council.

History 

There have previously been a number of local authorities responsible for the Hilligdon area. The current local authority was first elected in 1964, a year before formally coming into its powers and prior to the creation of the London Borough of Hillingdon on 1 April 1965. Hillingdon replaced Uxbridge Borough Council, Hayes and Harlington Urban District Council, Ruislip-Northwood Urban District Council and Yiewsley and West Drayton Urban District Council.

It was envisaged that through the London Government Act 1963 Hillingdon as a London local authority would share power with the Greater London Council. The split of powers and functions meant that the Greater London Council was responsible for "wide area" services such as fire, ambulance, flood prevention, and refuse disposal; with the local authorities responsible for "personal" services such as social care, libraries, cemeteries and refuse collection. As an outer London borough council it has been an education authority since 1965. This arrangement lasted until 1986 when Hillingdon London Borough Council gained responsibility for some services that had been provided by the Greater London Council, such as waste disposal. Since 2000 the Greater London Authority has taken some responsibility for highways and planning control from the council, but within the English local government system the council remains a "most purpose" authority in terms of the available range of powers and functions.

Powers and functions
The local authority derives its powers and functions from the London Government Act 1963 and subsequent legislation, and has the powers and functions of a London borough council. It sets council tax and as a billing authority also collects precepts for Greater London Authority functions and business rates. It sets planning policies which complement Greater London Authority and national policies, and decides on almost all planning applications accordingly.  It is a local education authority  and is also responsible for council housing, social services, libraries, waste collection and disposal, traffic, and most roads and environmental health.

Summary results of elections 

The council has been alternated between Conservative, Labour Party and no overall control since it was first elected in 1964.

Notes

References

External links 
London Borough of Hillingdon website

Local authorities in London
London borough councils
Politics of the London Borough of Hillingdon
Leader and cabinet executives
Local education authorities in England
Billing authorities in England